Lehigh Valley Railroad Station or Lehigh Valley Railroad Depot may refer to:

 Lehigh Valley Railroad Station (Ithaca, New York), listed on the NRHP in New York
 Lehigh Valley Railroad Station (Rochester, New York), listed on the NRHP in New York
Lehigh Valley Railroad Depot (Cazenovia, New York), listed on the NRHP in New York

See also
Lehigh Valley Railroad Headquarters Building, Bethlehem, Pennsylvania, listed on the NRHP in Northampton County, Pennsylvania